Celestino Vallejo de Miguel (born 8 December 1960) is a Spanish football manager.

Football career
Born in Valdemaluque, Soria, Castile and León, Vallejo began his career at local CD Numancia, working as an assistant manager for nearly ten years. On 10 May 2001 he was appointed first team manager, with the club seriously threatened with relegation in La Liga.

Despite suffering relegation, Vallejo was maintained in charge of the club. On 26 November 2001, after suffering a 1–5 heavy loss against Burgos CF, he was sacked.

In 2003 Vallejo was appointed at the helm of CD Guadalajara, in Tercera División. After one full campaign, he started working as a director of football.

References

External links

1960 births
Living people
Sportspeople from the Province of Soria
Spanish football managers
La Liga managers
Segunda División managers
CD Numancia managers
CD Guadalajara (Spain) managers